The 2011–12 Purdue Boilermakers men's basketball team represented Purdue University. The head coach of the Boilermakers was Matt Painter, in his ninth season with the Boilers. The team played its home games in Mackey Arena in West Lafayette, Indiana, U.S., and was a member of the Big Ten Conference.

Season notes
On October 27, senior forward Robbie Hummel was named to the Preseason First Team All-Big Ten for the third time in his Purdue career.
On November 11, newly renovated Mackey Arena was re-dedicated in conjunction with the team's game against Northern Illinois University. They won the game by 63 points, the program's highest win margin in 100 years.
On March 5, senior forward Robbie Hummel was named First-Team All-Big Ten for the third time, making him only the 12th player in the history of the conference to be so honored three times and the first Boilermaker since Rick Mount.
 On March 5, senior point guard Lewis Jackson was named Honorable Mention All-Big Ten for a second year in a row.
On March 5, junior DJ Byrd was named the Big Ten Sixth Man of the Year, as well as an Honorable Mention All-Big Ten.
On three occasions, Purdue committed a school-record 3 turnovers, losing to Wisconsin, Indiana, and @ Ohio State.
Purdue led the nation in turnovers per game, averaging 8.7 per contest.
On March 3 in a regular season finale loss @ Indiana, Robbie Hummel scored his 1,720th career point, putting him at the ninth spot on the career scoring list at Purdue. He joined recruiting classmates E'Twaun Moore and JaJuan Johnson in the top ten.
In conference play, Lewis Jackson led the Big Ten in assist/turnover margin.
With 438 career assists at the culmination of the regular season, Lewis Jackson is only 5 short of Wisconsin's Jordan Taylor's 443 to lead the Big Ten amongst active players.
Against Nebraska in the Big Ten tournament on March 8, Purdue tallied their 258th three-point field goal on the season, setting a program single-season record.

Roster

Incoming recruits

Schedule 

|-
!colspan=10| Exhibition
|-

|-
!colspan=9| Regular Season
|-

|-
!colspan=9| Big Ten tournament
|-

|-
!colspan=9| 2012 NCAA tournament

Rankings

Note: Purdue was seeded 37th by the NCAA Tournament selection committee.

2012 signing class

See also
2012 NCAA Division I men's basketball tournament
2011–12 NCAA Division I men's basketball season
2011-12 NCAA Division I men's basketball rankings
List of NCAA Division I institutions

References

Purdue
Purdue Boilermakers men's basketball seasons
Purdue
Purdue Boilermakers men's basketball
Purdue Boilermakers men's basketball